George Harman Jupp (26 February 1845 – 24 February 1930) was an English cricketer.  Jupp was a right-handed batsman who bowled roundarm slow, although with which hand he bowled with is unknown.  He was born at Brentford, Middlesex.

Jupp made his first-class debut for Middlesex in 1864 against Surrey at the Cattle Market Ground in Islington.  From 1867 to 1868, he represented Middlesex in 7 first-class matches, the last of which came against Surrey.  Jupp also played a single first-class match for the Gentlemen of the South against the Players of the South in 1867.  In his 8 first-class matches, he scored 181 runs at a batting average of 12.92, with a high score of 49.  With the ball he took 2 wickets at a bowling average of 24.50, with best figures of 2/49.

Jupp died at West Ealing, Middlesex on 24 February 1930.

References

External links
George Jupp at Cricinfo
George Jupp at CricketArchive

1845 births
1930 deaths
People from Brentford
English cricketers
Middlesex cricketers
Gentlemen of the South cricketers